Edelweiss Air AG is a Swiss leisure airline, charter airline and the sister company of Swiss International Air Lines. It operates flights to European and intercontinental destinations from its base at Zürich Airport.

History 

The airline was founded on 19 October 1995 in Bassersdorf, Switzerland, with just one aircraft, a McDonnell Douglas MD-83. The company's name is derived from the Swiss unofficial national flower, the Edelweiss, which is also painted on its aircraft.

The fleet was subsequently expanded and renewed. In 1998, new Airbus A320-200s were introduced to replace the MD-83s, and in 1999 long-haul flights were commenced using the Airbus A330-200.

For seven consecutive years between 2001 and 2008, Edelweiss Air received the golden Travelstar Award for its achievements.

Until November 2008, Edelweiss Air was wholly owned by Kuoni Travel and had 190 employees, when the operating rights were sold to Swiss International Air Lines, in exchange for sale rights of hotel capacities via the Swiss sales network. Following Swiss International Air Lines being acquired by the German Lufthansa Group in 2005, Edelweiss Air also became a subsidiary of Europe's largest airline group at the same time it was acquired by Swiss.

In March 2011, Edelweiss Air added the larger Airbus A330-300 to its fleet, with an order having been placed on 5 April 2010. In July 2015, it was announced that Edelweiss would receive four Airbus A340-300s between 2017 and 2018 previously operated by its parent Swiss International Air Lines. The aircraft were used to expand the route network.

In November 2015, Edelweiss introduced a revised livery on one of its Airbus A320-200s which was subsequently applied to the rest of the airline's fleet. In December 2016, Edelweiss Air phased out its sole Airbus A330-200, which was transferred to Brussels Airlines and replaced by Airbus A340-300s inherited from parent Swiss. In 2021 Lufthansa moved Edelweiss Air's two Airbus A330-300s to Eurowings Discover.

Destinations

Fleet

Current fleet

, Edelweiss Air operates the following aircraft:

Former fleet 
Edelweiss Air has previously operated the following aircraft:

References

External links

Official website

Airlines of Switzerland
Airlines established in 1995
Companies based in the canton of Zürich
Lufthansa